KOMPSAT-1 (Korean Multi-purpose Satellite-1), also known as Arirang-1, was a satellite created by the Korea Aerospace Research Institute (KARI) and launched by a United States launch vehicle on 21 December 1999. This was the first satellite built primarily by South Korean engineers, although previous foreign-built satellites had been launched by Korean companies. It took its name from the popular Korean folk song Arirang.

Instruments 
The satellite carried remote sensing instruments for providing digital cartography of Korea, and status of marine biology. Also included was the Ionospheric Measurement Sensor (IMS) to monitor ionospheric parameters along the satellite orbit and the High Energy Particles Detector (HEPD).

High Energy Particle Detector (HEPD) 
The High Energy Particle Detector (HEPD) instrument consists of a Proton and Electron Spectrometer (PES), a Linear Energy transfer Spectrometer (LET), a Total Dose Monitor (TDM), and a Single Event Monitor (SEM), PES measures protons from 6.4 MeV to 38 MeV in 3 energy channels, electrons from 0.25 MeV to <2.0 MeV in 3 energy channels, and alpha particles from 15 MeV to 60 MeV in an energy channel. LET measures linear energy transfer. TDM measures total ionizing dose of radiation accumulated on RADFET dosimeters. SEM measures single event upset (SEU).

Ionospheric Measurement Sensor (IMS) 
The Ionospheric Measurement Sensor (IMS) is composed of a Langmuir probe (LP) and of the Electron Temperature Probe (ETP) developed by K. Oyama (Institute of Space and Astronautical Science (ISAS), Japan). LP measures the in-situ electron temperature and density and ETP measures the in-situ electron temperature and floating potential. The instrument monitored the variation of the nighttime ionosphere along the satellite track until the unexpected power failure of the probes on 2 August 2001.

Launch 
The satellite was launched from Vandenberg Air Force Base in California on a Taurus 2110. It had been built in Daedeok Science Town in Daejeon, South Korea. The parts were shipped in three stages from Korea to California by First Express International, a Korean shipping firm.

The KOMPSAT-1 was succeeded by the KOMPSAT-2 in 2006.

Mission 
On 30 December 2007, the KARI reported that they had lost contact with the satellite. It is suspected to have had a malfunction that has affected power generation. After the loss of contact with the satellite, the mission was formally ended 31 January 2008.

References

External links 
 Profile of Korean space program by The Korea Times 

Satellites of South Korea
Satellites orbiting Earth
Spacecraft launched in 1999